Johnny Gerard Plate (born 10 September 1956) is an Indonesian politician and businessman who is serving as the current Minister of Communication and Information Technology in Joko Widodo's Onward Indonesia Cabinet since 2019. Previously, he served in the People's Representative Council for five years, and had been reelected for a second term in the 2019 election. He is a graduate of Atma Jaya Catholic University of Indonesia.

Early life and education
Johnny was born in the town of Ruteng, in Flores, on 10 September 1956. He studied economics and business management at the Atma Jaya Catholic University.

Career
In the early 1980s, he entered the business of agricultural equipment, during a boom in new plantations in Kalimantan and Papua. He later joined AirAsia and served as commissioner in several companies.

Johnny ran in the 2014 legislative election as a Nasdem Party candidate in the East Nusa Tenggara 1 electoral district, and he successfully secured a seat after winning 33,704 votes. During his term in the People's Representative Council, he was appointed secretary-general of Nasdem in 2017. He was reelected in 2019 with 115,921 votes.

On 23 October 2019, President Joko Widodo appointed Johnny as the Minister of Communication and Information Technology.

References

1956 births
Living people
People from East Nusa Tenggara
Onward Indonesia Cabinet
Government ministers of Indonesia
Members of the People's Representative Council, 2014
Members of the People's Representative Council, 2019
Nasdem Party politicians
Indonesian Roman Catholics